Vice-Admiral Hasan Hafeez Ahmed (Urdu:حسن حفيظ احمد; b. 1926-8 March 1975), usually shortened to H.H. Ahmed, was a senior Pakistan Navy officer who served as the first Chief of Naval Staff (CNS) of Pakistan Navy from 1972 until his death from sickness in 1975.

Despite appointed to the four-star appointment, he was retained at the three-star rank and took over the command of the Navy from its Commander-in-Chief Vice-Admiral Muzaffar Hassan who was dismissed from the military service.

Biography

Hassan Hafeez Ahmad was born in Multan, Punjab, British India, in 1926. He was educated in a local school in Multan and was a contemporary of Mansoor Shah who would later join the Pakistan Air Force in 1947.

After his high school graduation in 1943, he joined the Royal Indian Navy as a petty officer and participated in World War II. In 1945, he joined the Britannia Royal Naval College in Dartmouth, England where he graduated in 1947. Upon returning to British India, he joined the Pakistan Navy and was commissioned as a Sub-Lieutenant. He continued his training with the Royal Navy and specialized in technical naval courses from the United Kingdom in 1947-49.

In 1964, he attended the Joint Service Defence College in Latimer Buckinghamshire, England, and subsequently graduated with a joint staff degree in 1965. Upon his return, he was posted in Ministry of Defence as an undersecretary as a Director of Naval Operations and participated in the Indo-Pakistani war of 1965. After the war, he was posted to the Pakistan Embassy in Washington D.C. as a military attaché which he remained until 1966. In 1970, he was appointed as the first commandant of the Pakistan Naval Academy as a Commodore and was appointed as Commander Coast in 1971 as a Rear-Admiral. 

After participating in the Indo-Pakistani war of 1971 he continued to serve as commander of the coastal defense command but demoted to Commodore in the Navy. In 1972, he was elevated as the first Chief of Naval Staff after the dismissal of Muzaffar Hassan. He was the most junior officer and superseded five senior's including three Rear-Admirals and two Commodores.

As a naval chief, his task was to reconstruct and rebuild the navy into a formidable force. In a short spa of time, he transformed the Navy into three-dimensional force when he commissioned the naval aviation and commissioning the new Navy NHQ in Rawalpindi in the vicinity of Army GHQ in 1974.

On 8 March 1975, he died from sickness unexpectedly while serving as naval chief and commanding the navy, at the age of 49. He was the first of two chief's of staff who died in the office- the other being General Asif Nawaz.

Sources

External links
Official website of Pakistan Navy

 

1926 births
1975 deaths
Punjabi people
Rashtriya Indian Military College alumni
Royal Indian Navy officers
Graduates of Britannia Royal Naval College
Pakistan Navy admirals
Pakistani diplomats
Chiefs of Naval Staff (Pakistan)
Admirals of the Indo-Pakistani War of 1971
Recipients of Tamgha-e-Quaid-e-Azam
Pakistani military attachés